Al-Rajib is a town in the Amman Governorate in northwestern Jordan. In classical sources, Ar Rajib is known as Reğeb (Ragaba).

References

Populated places in Amman Governorate